Amerila rufifemur is a moth of the subfamily Arctiinae. It was described by Francis Walker in 1855. It is found in Angola and the Democratic Republic of the Congo.

References

 , 1997: A revision of the Afrotropical taxa of the genus Amerila Walker (Lepidoptera, Arctiidae). Systematic Entomology 22 (1): 1-44.
 , 1855: List of the Specimens of Lepidopterous Insects in the Collection of the British Museum 3: 583-775, Edward Newman: London.

Moths described in 1855
Arctiinae
Insects of the Democratic Republic of the Congo
Insects of Angola
Moths of Africa